Statistics of Swiss Super League in the 1927–28 season.

East

Table

Results

Central

Table

Results

West

Table

Results

Final

Table

Results 

|colspan="3" style="background-color:#D0D0D0" align=center|22 April 1928

|-
|colspan="3" style="background-color:#D0D0D0" align=center|29 April 1928

|-
|colspan="3" style="background-color:#D0D0D0" align=center|13 May 1928

Grasshopper Club Zürich won the championship.

Sources 
 Switzerland 1927-28 at RSSSF

Swiss Serie A seasons
Swiss
Football